= Gilson Peak =

Summit in Nevada, United States

Coordinates: 39°46′10″N 115°48′40″W

Gilson Peak is a summit in the U.S. state of Nevada. The elevation is 9,058 feet (2,761 m).

Gilson Peak was named after the Gilson brothers, early settlers to the area. A variant name is "Gilsons Peak".
